Gijimasu was the King of Kano from 1095 to 1134. He was the son of Warisi and Yanas.

Succession
Gijimasu was succeeded by his twin sons Nawata and Gawata.

Biography in the Kano Chronicle
Below is a biography of Gijimasu from Palmer's 1908 English translation of the Kano Chronicle.

References

12th-century monarchs in Africa
Monarchs of Kano
1134 deaths